Collector Malathy is a 1967 Indian Malayalam film, directed by M. Krishnan Nair and produced by A. K. Subrahmaniam. The film stars Prem Nazir, Sheela, Ambika and Sukumari in the lead roles. The film had musical score by M. S. Baburaj.

Cast

Prem Nazir as Ravi Varma
Sheela as Malathi
Ambika as Indu
Sukumari as Madhavikkutty
Adoor Bhasi as Kittunni
Manavalan Joseph as Appoonju
Pattom Sadan as Sarasan
Sankaradi as Thirumeni
Aranmula Ponnamma as Subhadra
Jayakumari
Kottarakkara Sreedharan Nair as Thirumeni
T. S. Muthaiah

Soundtrack
The music was composed by M. S. Baburaj and the lyrics were written by Vayalar Ramavarma.

References

External links
 

1967 films
1960s Malayalam-language films
Films directed by M. Krishnan Nair
Films scored by M. S. Baburaj